The 1990 All-Ireland Under-21 Football Championship was the 27th staging of the All-Ireland Under-21 Football Championship since its establishment by the Gaelic Athletic Association in 1964.

Cork entered the championship as defending champions, however, they were defeated by Kerry in the Munster final.

On 13 May 1990, Kerry won the championship following a 5–12 to 2–11 defeat of Tyrone in the All-Ireland final. This was their sixth All-Ireland title overall and their first in 13 championship seasons.

Results

All-Ireland Under-21 Football Championship

Semi-finals

Final

Statistics

Miscellaneous

 The All-Ireland semi-final between Tyrone and Meath is the first championship meeting between the two teams.

References

1990
All-Ireland Under-21 Football Championship